The 7th Toronto International Film Festival (TIFF) took place in Toronto, Ontario, Canada between September 9 and September 18, 1982. The festival paid tribute to Martin Scorsese, who attended along with Robert De Niro, Robert Duvall and Harvey Keitel. Scorsese also participated in Q&A at the festival, with Roger Ebert and Gene Siskel.

Atom Egoyan and Bruce McDonald screened their short films Open House and Let Me See respectively outside University theatre, which was the main theatre of the festival, after their films were rejected from 1982 festival.

Awards

Programme

Gala Presentation
Angel by Neil Jordan 
Bad Blood by Mike Newell
Hammett by Wim Wenders
Identification of a Woman by Michelangelo Antonioni
Moonlighting by Jerzy Skolimowski
Pinkel by Dick Rijneke
A Question of Silence by Marleen Gorris
Starstruck by Gillian Armstrong
The Hes Case by Orlow Seunke
Tempest by Paul Mazursky
Toute une nuit by Chantal Akerman
Veronika Voss by Rainer Werner Fassbinder
We of the Never Never by Igor Auzins

Canadian cinema
The Grey Fox by Phillip Borsos
Hank Williams: The Show He Never Gave by David Acomba
Wild Flowers (Les fleurs sauvages) by Jean Pierre Lefebvre

References

External links
 Official site
 TIFF: A Reel History: 1976 - 2012
1982 Toronto International Film Festival at IMDb

1982
1982 film festivals
1982 in Toronto
1982 in Canadian cinema